Bengt Gunnar Malmsten (20 March 1922 – 20 December 1996) was a Swedish speed skater who competed in the 1952 Winter Olympics and in the 1956 Winter Olympics.

He was born in Borlänge and died in Stockholm.

In 1952 he finished 31st in the 500 metres competition.

Four years later he finished seventh in the 500 metres event and 17th in the 1500 metres contest at the 1956 Games.

References

External links
 profile

1922 births
1996 deaths
Swedish male speed skaters
Olympic speed skaters of Sweden
Speed skaters at the 1952 Winter Olympics
Speed skaters at the 1956 Winter Olympics
People from Borlänge Municipality
Sportspeople from Dalarna County
20th-century Swedish people